The Fremont Tribune is a daily newspaper in Fremont, Nebraska.

The Tribune was founded on July 24, 1868 by J.N. Hayes. It was purchased in 1966 by Speidel Newspapers; Gannett Co. acquired the paper in 1977 through its merger with Speidel. Gannett sold the Tribune in 1989 to Hometown Communications of Little Rock, Arkansas. The paper was later acquired by Independent Media Group; Lee Enterprises bought the Tribune from IMG in 2000.

The Tribune received the 1931 Pulitzer Prize for Editorial Writing for "The Gentleman From Nebraska".

The current editor is Tony Gray.

References

External links

 
 

1868 establishments in Nebraska
Daily newspapers published in the United States
Dodge County, Nebraska
Lee Enterprises publications
Newspapers published in Nebraska
Publications established in 1868